Hazratganj, officially known as Atal Chowk,  is the downtown and the main shopping centre of Lucknow, the capital and the largest city of the Indian state of Uttar Pradesh. In addition to bazaars, it also contains shopping complexes, restaurants, hotels, theaters, cafés and many offices.

History 
In 1827, the then Nawab Nasir-ud-Din Haidar Shah  laid the foundation of the Ganj market by introducing the China Bazaar and Kaptaan Bazaar which sold goods from China, Japan and Belgium. The famous Taar Wali Kothi, the Dargah of 12 Imams at Khas Mukaam, the Choti Chattar Manzil, the Saawan-Bhadoh Mahal (the present location of zoo), the stunning Baradari, which was earlier situated between Kaiserbagh, Darulshafa, and Lalbagh also emerged during his regime.

In 1842, the name of the area was changed to Hazratganj after Nawab Amjad Ali Shah, who was popularly known by his alias 'Hazrat'.

After the First War of Independence in 1857, Britishers took over the city and Hazratganj was modelled after London's Queen Street. Many old Mughal style buildings were demolished and new European structures came up.

Ring Theatre, the present GPO,  served add the Ball Room and theatre for the British officers and was called 'Entertainment Centre'. It's another matter that its doors would be closed for the natives. This place was exclusively for the Britishers and natives were barred from entering. Later on, it was converted into a special court and witnessed the hearing for the Kakori Conspiracy case. In 1929–1932, the building was renovated in Gothic style and a clock tower was constructed in the centre and The GPO, which was then situated in Janpath, was shifted to this building after that.

When Amjad Ali Shah died, his son Wajid Ali Shah got an Imambara constructed in Sibtainabad at a cost of 10 Lacs. The magnificent edifice is now called Sibtainabad Imambara, which is a centrally protected monument, and a Shia wakf under the UP Shia Central Board of Wakfs, and situated on Mahatma Gandhi Marg, Opposite Halwasiya Market. The monument, which was under heavy encroachments and neglect has recently been restored to its old glory and is a Heritage Lover's delight.

The Indian Coffee House (ICH) came up during the First World War (1914–1918) and was then owned by the Filmistan cinema which today is known as Sahu Cinema. Unlike Mayfair and Ring Theatre, ICH was crowded by Indians all the time. In the 1920s, the place became a paradise for journalists and writers and thinkers like Dr Ram Manohar Lohia Atal Bihari V, Chandra Shekhar  to Yashpal, Amritlal Nagar , Bhagwati Charan Verma and Anand Narain Mulla  who expressed their views over a cup of coffee. On August 16, 2019, it was renamed to "Atal Chowk", to honor the late prime minister, Atal Bihari Vajpayee.

Beautification and makeover

In 2010, to celebrate 200 years of Hazratganj, the then government started a programme for the makeover of the area. The original makeover plan designed by country's noted architect Nasir Munjee several years ago worked as the base for the final plan that entailed an expense of Rs 30 crore.

Hoardings from rooftops and encroachments on the road were removed. Buildings were painted in a uniform crème and pink, same size and colour signages, stone pavements and the Victorian style balustrades, lamp posts, waste-bins, benches, an open air tiny amphitheatre and colourful fountains were constructed. The century-old fire station was demolished to make way for the modern multi-level parking.

Shopping

"Ganjing" is ambling and shopping in the wide lanes and by lanes of city's Ganj market.

Hazratganj is a major Victorian style shopping area. It houses showrooms, shopping complexes, restaurants, hotels, cafés, theatres, offices and businesses. Hazratganj shops sell the famous Lucknow Chikan material. Gurjari, Handloom Emporium and Gandhi Ashrams are also located in the market.

The Sahara Ganj Mall is a 5-storied major shopping mall located in Hazratganj. It is one of the largest shopping malls in India, covering an area of over 425,000 square feet.[4] It also has PVR movie theaters besides a huge food court.

Naza Market, part of Hazratganj, is the biggest market for computer/IT goods in the state [5] and second largest in India after Delhi's Nehru Place. Naza Market is the biggest piracy market in whole Asia. Microsoft has prepared list for piracy vendors and going to start anti-piracy drive.

Movie theaters
Hazratganj has two operating cinema, Sahu Cinema located right next to the main Hazratganj crossroad and the Novelty cinema at Lalbagh Circle. The closed Mayfair Cinema was once known for showing Hollywood Movies. Other former cinemas in Hazratganj include Capitol and the now-demolished Leela.

Ganj Carnival 
Lucknow Development Authority (LDA) together with city's administration organizes monthly carnival on the second Sunday of each month in Hazratganj market. On this night, the market becomes a no-parking zone with barricades and security services. Various types of cultural and entertainment programmes are held for the general public. Lucknow Police watches the crowd with the help of drone cameras.

Atal Chowk
Atal Chowk crossing is the busiest crossing of Lucknow city. It is situated at the confluence of NH-24, NH-25, NH-28 and NH-24B. The whole area along with the crossing falls in Lucknow's Heritage zone.

Metro station

There is a metro station here in Lucknow Metro. This is an underground metro station.

Schools and colleges
Hazratganj area is home to St. Francis' College, Seventh Day Adventist Senior Secondary School, La Martiniere Girls' College, Loreto Convent Lucknow , Christ Church College, National P. G. College and St. Joseph's Cathedral.

References

Neighbourhoods in Lucknow
Shopping districts and streets in India